OpenRice is a food and restaurant guide website that operates in Hong Kong, Malaysia, Japan, Macau, Mainland China, Taiwan, Singapore, Indonesia, the Philippines and Thailand.

History

Initially launched for Hong Kong (with the Traditional Chinese version only) in 1999, the English version was later introduced to accommodate the increasing demand from non-Chinese-speaking Hong Kongers and foreign residents in Hong Kong. , the Hong Kong website has approximately 40,000 recorded restaurants, 530,000 registered diners and over 572,000 ratings and comments.

See also
 Chinese cuisine
 Hong Kong cuisine
 List of websites about food and drink
 Singaporean cuisine

References

External links

 

Hong Kong websites
Multilingual websites
Websites about food and drink